Abderrahim Foukara (born April 14, 1962) is the Al Jazeera's Washington, D.C. bureau chief.

Career timeline 
 Early 2006–present: Al Jazeera's Washington, D.C. bureau chief
 Early 2006–present : Host of Min Washington ('From Washington'), a weekly show on American Politics and Culture
 Early 2003-Early 2006: Head of Al-Jazeera New York Bureau's United Nations office
 Summer 2002-Early 2003: Al Jazeera Reporter from Washington, D.C.
 2001-Summer 2002: BBC Reporter from Washington, D.C.
 1999-2001: producer and reporter on the World, a co-production of the BBC, Public Radio International and WGBH Boston
 1990-1999: producer, reporter, anchor and senior instructor on BBC World Service

References

External links 

 Abderrahim Foukara on Charlie Rose
 Abderrahim Foukara on The Daily Show with Jon Stewart

1962 births
Living people
Moroccan male journalists
Al Jazeera people
Moroccan emigrants to the United States
American Sunni Muslims
People from Marrakesh
20th-century American journalists
American male journalists
American Muslims